Jungwonsan is a mountain in Yangpyeong County, Gyeonggi-do, in  South Korea.

See also
 List of mountains in Korea

Notes

References
 

Mountains of South Korea
Mountains of Gyeonggi Province